The Women's Hoofdklasse Hockey is the women's top division of Field hockey in the Netherlands. The league ranks first in the European league ranking table. The league was established in 1981 and before the league existed the champions of the several districts played in a championship pool to determine the national champion.

Amsterdam are the current champions, having won the 2018–19 season by defeating Den Bosch in the championship final. Amsterdam won 20 titles, followed by Den Bosch with 19 and HOC with 14 titles.

Format
The season starts in August or September of each year and is interrupted by the indoor hockey season from November to February. From March the outdoor season will be continued. The league is played by twelve teams who play each other twice and who compete for four spots in the championship play-offs. The number one and four and the number two and three play each other in the semi-final and the winners qualify for the final where the winner will be crowned champion. The last-placed team is relegated to the second division, the Promotieklasse. The eleventh-placed team plays in a relegation play-off against the runners-up of the Promotieklasse and the tenth-placed team plays a relegation play-off against the third-placed from the Promotieklasse. The winners of these matches will play the next season in the Hoofdklasse.

Clubs

Accommodation and locations

List of champions

National champions (1920–1981)

Hoofdklasse era (1981–present)

Champions

By club

By province

Media coverage
Since 2015, almost every Sunday, one match from either the men's or the women's league is broadcast live by either Ziggo Sport or the NOS.

See also
Men's Hoofdklasse Hockey

References

Field hockey leagues in the Netherlands
Sports leagues established in 1981
1981 establishments in the Netherlands
Neth
Women's field hockey competitions in the Netherlands